Marius is a 1929 play by the French writer Marcel Pagnol. It takes place in Marseilles, where a young man named Marius working in a café dreams of going to sea, his obsession eventually overcoming his developing romance with Fanny, a local girl.

Two years later a British version Sea Fever by John Van Druten was staged unsuccessfully in the West End. The same year Pagnol wrote a sequel Fanny.

Film adaptation
In 1931 the play was turned into a film Marius directed by Alexander Korda for the French subsidiary of Paramount Pictures with a screenplay written by Pagnol himself. In 1938 this was remade as an American film Port of Seven Seas by James Whale. In 2013 it was remade by Daniel Auteuil.

References

Bibliography
 Goble, Alan. The Complete Index to Literary Sources in Film. Walter de Gruyter, 1999.
 Wearing, J.P. The London Stage 1930-1939: A Calendar of Productions, Performers, and Personnel.  Rowman & Littlefield, 2014.

1929 plays
Plays by Marcel Pagnol
Plays set in France
French plays adapted into films